Nur ol Dinabad or Nur ed Dinabad or Nur od Dinabad may refer to:
 Nur ol Dinabad, West Azerbaijan